Jako kníže Rohan is a Czech drama film. It was released in 1983.

Cast
Vladimír Menšík as Špáta
Ludmila Roubíková as Špátová
Jana Gýrová as Baruška
Věra Galatíková as Pacačka
Ladislav Pešek as Žežulík
Libuše Havelková as Žežulíková
Josef Bláha as Krančil
Simona Stašová as Pepi Krančilová
Roman Hemala as úřední poslíček
Václav Kotva as Klabík
Jan Pohan as Poklasný
Viktor Maurer as Jiřička
Mirko Musil as Kubišta
Jan Faltýnek as Břízek
Robert Vrchota as Hostinský
Karel Houska as Doktor

External links
 

Czech drama films
1980s Czech-language films
1983 films
1980s Czech films